Probable G-protein coupled receptor 61 is a protein that in humans is encoded by the GPR61 gene.

This gene belongs to the G-protein coupled receptor 1 family. G protein-coupled receptors contain 7 transmembrane domains and transduce extracellular signals through heterotrimeric G proteins. The protein encoded by this gene is most closely related to biogenic amine receptors.

References

Further reading

See also
 

G protein-coupled receptors